Randi Runa Svenkerud Flesland (born 17 November 1955 in Oslo) is a Norwegian civil servant.

Flesland was educated at Trinity College, Dublin, with education in economics, with addition of psychology and pedagogy in the universities of Oslo and Davis, California. She had several leading positions in Norges Statsbaner, for 17 yrs until 2000, such as head of Intercity, Financial director and finally deputy CEO. 
She then became director of the Norwegian National Airport Administration; later the agency became Avinor. She was in charge of a substantial restructurering of work processes and increased efficiency in order to make financial room for large safety investments. She resigned December 2005  after a long conflict of interests with the trade unions for traffic controllers. She was instead hired in IBM. In 2008 she became the new director of the Norwegian Consumer Council. She has also held several executive board positions, mostly within transport and public health.

She shares the name Flesland with Norway's second largest airport.

References

1955 births
Living people
Norwegian expatriates in Ireland
Alumni of Trinity College Dublin
Norwegian State Railways people
Norwegian people in rail transport
Directors of government agencies of Norway
Avinor people